Vorel is a common Czech surname that derives from orel (eagle). The feminine form of the name is Vorlová. Notable people include:

Jan Vorel (born 1978), Czech football player
Lascăr Vorel (1879–1918), Romanian painter
Marek Vorel (born 1977), Czech ice hockey player
Michal Vorel (born 1975), Czech football player
Sláva Vorlová (1894–1973), Czech composer
Tomáš Vorel (born 1957), Czech director, scriptwriter, and actor
Vojtěch Vorel, Czech football player

References

Czech-language surnames